Illya Serhiyovych Haliuza (born 16 November 1979) is a retired Ukrainian football midfielder.

External links
 
 

1979 births
Living people
Sportspeople from Arkhangelsk
Russian emigrants to Ukraine
Ukrainian footballers
Association football midfielders
Ukrainian expatriate footballers
Expatriate footballers in Russia
Ukrainian expatriate sportspeople in Russia
Expatriate footballers in Belarus
Ukrainian expatriate sportspeople in Belarus
Expatriate footballers in Lithuania
Ukrainian expatriate sportspeople in Lithuania
FC Zorya Luhansk players
FC Chornomorets Odesa players
FC Chornomorets-2 Odesa players
FC Dnepr Mogilev players
FC Oryol players
FC Šiauliai players
SC Tavriya Simferopol players
FC Shakhtyor Soligorsk players
FC Belshina Bobruisk players
Ukrainian Premier League players
Ukrainian First League players
Ukrainian Second League players
Belarusian Premier League players
Belarusian First League players
A Lyga players
Russian First League players